John Kirkpatrick may refer to:

John Kirkpatrick (politician) (1840–1904), Australian politician
John Simpson Kirkpatrick (1892–1915), British-born Australian soldier
John Kirkpatrick (pianist) (1905–1991), American classical pianist and music scholar
John Kirkpatrick (musician) (born 1947), English player of free reed instruments
John Kirkpatrick (rugby league) (born 1979), English rugby league footballer of the 2000s
John Lycan Kirkpatrick (1813–1885), president of Davidson College
John Bayard Kirkpatrick, mayor of New Brunswick, New Jersey